KBCW may refer to:

 KBCW (TV), a television station (channel 28, virtual 44) licensed to San Francisco, California, United States
 KBCW-FM, a radio station (91.9 FM) licensed to McAlester, Oklahoma, United States